Mahakaal (also known as Mahakaal: The Monster) is a 1994 Indian horror film directed by Shyam Ramsay and Tulsi Ramsay. It was loosely plagiarised off of the American horror film A Nightmare on Elm Street (1984) and was also the last film produced by Ramsay Brothers.

Plot
A college student Seema sees in her nightmare that a horrible looking man wearing steel claw gloves attacks her. She wakes up to find that she has real wounds on her arm. Later her friend Anita too sees the same nightmare and finds real wounds on her arm. Anita tells her parents about her nightmare. Her father, who is a policeman, refuses to believe it. Later, Seema is attacked again in her dream and she dies because of the wounds. Her boyfriend is put in police lockup where he sees the horrible man who makes snakes appear by magic. The boyfriend dies of snake-bite. Later, Anita and her mother catch Anita's father taking out a metal clawed glove from his drawer, so he is forced to reveal the secret that an evil magician Shakaal had been kidnapping children and sacrificing them to increase his evil powers. Seven years back, Shakaal had killed Anita's sister too. Finally, Shakaal kidnaps Anita. As her father knows Shakaal's place, he arrives with Anita's boyfriend and they manage to kill him and save Anita.

Cast
 Karan Shah - Prakash
 Archana Puran Singh - Anita
 Reema Lagoo - Anita's mother
 Johnny Lever - Canteen & Hotel Manager
 Kulbhushan Kharbanda - Anita's father
 Mahaveer Bhullar - Shakaal
 Kunickaa Sadanand - Seema
 Mayur Verma - Param
 Baby Swetha - Mohini (Anita's Sister)
 Sunil Dhawan - College Principal
 Dinesh Kaushik - Randheer
 Asha Patel - Cabaret Dancer
 Narender nath - Pujari

Soundtrack

References

External links
 
 Mahakaal

1994 horror films
1994 films
Films about child death
Films about witchcraft
Fiction about human sacrifice
Indian supernatural horror films
1990s Hindi-language films
1990s serial killer films
Films scored by Anand–Milind
Indian remakes of American films
Hindi remakes of English films
A Nightmare on Elm Street (franchise)
Indian horror film remakes
Indian slasher films
Films directed by Shyam Ramsay
Films directed by Tulsi Ramsay